Vincenzo Irolli (30 September 1860 – 27 November 1949) was an Italian painter.

Biography
Vincenzo Irolli was born in Naples. He enrolled at the Naples Institute of Fine Arts, where his masters included Gioacchino Toma, in 1877 and graduated three years later. The work he presented regularly at the exhibitions of the Naples Società Promotrice di Belle Arti as from 1879 comprised portraits and genre scenes. 
In 1884 in Turin, he exhibited Amore e dovere and Le Maddalene d' oggi; in 1880 in Milan and in 1887 in Venice, he exhibited numerous drawings from reality.

He became a member of the Circolo Artistico Napoletano in 1890 and worked with Vincenzo Migliaro and other local artists on decorations for the Caffè Gambrinus at the end of the decade. A regular participant in major national events, he also presented work at the Salon in Paris, where he won great success, and at international exhibitions, including London (1904), Munich (1909) and Barcelona (1911), where he was awarded a bronze medal. Alongside intense maternal figures, portraits of children and colorful scenes of everyday life, he also depicted religious subjects, as in the ten works presented at the Mostra di Arte Sacra of 1936 in Naples.

References
 Laura Casone, Vincenzo Irolli, online catalogue Artgate by Fondazione Cariplo, 2010, CC BY-SA (source for the first revision of this article).

Bibliography 
 Enzo Savoia, Laura Savoia, Vincenzo Irolli. Il pittore del sole, 2002, Bottegantica,

Other projects

19th-century Italian painters
Italian male painters
20th-century Italian painters
Painters from Naples
Italian genre painters
1860 births
1949 deaths
19th-century Italian male artists
20th-century Italian male artists